Art Porter Sr. (8 February 1934 – 22 July 1993) was an American jazz pianist from Little Rock, Arkansas. During his musical career, he performed with the Art Porter Trio, founded in 1962, and the Art Porter Singers, founded in 1976. Although primarily playing locally, Porter played FESTAC 77, the World Black and African Festival of Arts and Culture held in Nigeria in 1977, and with saxophonist son Art Porter Jr. did a European tour in 1991 that included festivals in Belgium, Germany, and the Netherlands.

Porter was also known as an educator. An alum of AM&N College (1954, BA in Music Education) and Henderson State University (1975, MS in Music Education), Porter taught at various high schools and colleges, including Parkview High School in Little Rock, Mississippi Valley College and Philander Smith College. In addition to producing several education television shows, The Minor Key and Porterhouse Cuts (the latter of which was broadcast throughout 14 states in the US southeast), he is known for his musical influence on former United States President Bill Clinton.

In 1993, Porter received the inaugural Lifetime Achievement Award from the Arkansas Jazz and Heritage Foundation.

Select discography
Little Rock A.M.
Something Else
Portrait of Art

External links
Arthur (Art) L. Porter Sr. (1934–1993), Arkansas Jazz Hall of Fame

1934 births
1993 deaths
American jazz pianists
American male pianists
Musicians from Little Rock, Arkansas
20th-century American pianists
Jazz musicians from Arkansas
20th-century American male musicians
American male jazz musicians